The Bellingham Business Journal was a monthly business publication based in Bellingham, Washington. Established in 1992, the newspaper won several Society of Professional Journalists awards for reporting, editorial and design content.

The paper was owned by Sound Publishing (a Black Press company), based in Poulsbo. The publication was purchased from Marysville, Washington-based Sun News Inc. in August 2007.

BBJToday.com, the online arm of The Bellingham Business Journal, launched in July 2009.

Bellingham Business Journal discontinued publishing in March of 2020 citing the COVID-19 pandemic.

History
The Bellingham Business Journal was founded by Al Raines, owner of Raines Publishing, in November 1992. In the first issue, Raines states in his opening column that he started the paper because "local business professionals... need a publication that will keep them abreast of what's going on in the business environment around them." Raines continued to publish the newspaper every month until it was purchased Robin Yeager in early 1994. Yeager sold the paper nearly six months later to Wenatchee Business Journal owners Mike Cassidy and Jim Corcoran. The partners sold the business to Sun News Inc. in 2001.

The Bellingham paper was sold to Sound Publishing in 2007.

References

Newspapers published in Washington (state)
Black Press